This is a list of the members of the Australian House of Representatives in the 18th Australian Parliament, which was elected at the 1946 election on  28 September 1946. The incumbent Australian Labor Party led by Prime Minister of Australia Ben Chifley defeated the newly formed opposition Liberal Party of Australia (descended from the United Australia Party) led by its founder Robert Menzies with coalition partner the Country Party led by Arthur Fadden.

Notes

References

Members of Australian parliaments by term
20th-century Australian politicians